John E. Bowers is an American physicist, engineer, researcher and educator. He is the Fred Kavli Chair in Nanotechnology, the director of the Institute for Energy Efficiency and a distinguished professor in the Departments of Electrical and Computer Engineering and Materials at University of California, Santa Barbara. He was the deputy director of American Institute of Manufacturing of Integrated Photonics from 2015 to 2022.

Bowers' research is focused on silicon photonic integrated circuits for fiber optic communications. He has edited two books, published sixteen book chapters, 700 journal papers, and 1100 conference papers. He holds 67 patents. He has co-founded six companies, including Terabit Technology (acquired by Ciena), Aerius Photonics (acquired by FLIR), Aurrion (acquired by Juniper), Calient Networks, Nexus Photonics and Quintessent.

Bowers is a member of the National Academy of Engineering, a fellow of the IEEE, OSA, the American Physical Society, and the American Association for the Advancement to Science (AAAS). He is a recipient of the IEEE Photonics Award, OSA Tyndall Award, OSA Holonyak Prize, the IEEE LEOS William Streifer Award and the South Coast Business and Technology Pioneer and Entrepreneur of the Year Awards. He is a highly cited researcher.

Education 
Bowers received a B.S. in physics from University of Minnesota in 1976. He then received an M.S. in applied physics in 1978 and a Ph.D. in Applied Physics in 1981, both from Stanford University. After completing his Ph.D., he received his post-doctoral training at Ginzton Laboratory at Stanford University.

Career 
In 1982, Bowers joined the AT&T Bell Laboratories as a member of the technical staff. In 1987, he left AT&T to join University of California, Santa Barbara as a professor in the Department of Electrical and Computer Engineering. Since then, he has worked at UCSB. In 1996, he was appointed as the Director of Multidisciplinary Optical Switching Technology Center at UCSB and served in this position until 2003. He founded the Center for Entrepreneurship and Engineering Management at UCSB in 1998 and then served as its director until 2001. 

Bowers was elected a member of the National Academy of Engineering in 2005 for contributions to the development of high-speed semiconductor lasers and other optical devices for optical switching and communications systems.

In 2008, he founded the Institute of Energy Efficiency to focus research at UCSB on reducing energy consumption and has served as its director since.

From 2009 to 2014, Bowers served as the director of Center Energy Efficient Materials, an initiative at the Department of Energy, Energy Frontier Research Centers. He contributed in establishing the American Institute of Manufacturing Integrated Photonics and took on the position of its Deputy Director in 2015. The Institute's work is focused on driving low cost, high volume CMOS processing of photonic integrated circuits (PICs).

Entrepreneurship 
Along with his career in academia, Bowers has also been involved in founding and managing several businesses for commercialization of technology. In 1996, Bowers co-founded Terabit Technology and served as its president for the next two years until it was acquired by Ciena. He later co-founded Calient Networks in 1999 and worked as the CTO of the company until 2002. With his students, he co-founded Aerius Photonics (acquired by FLIR), Aurrion (acquired by Juniper Networks), Nexus Photonics, Mirios, and Quintessent.

Bowers taught classes in entrepreneurship at UCSB for over twenty years, and started the Center for Entrepreneurship and Engineering Management (CEEM) at UCSB, which grew into the Technology Management Program (TMP) at UCSB, which offers PhDs, Master of Technology Management and Certificates of Technology Management.

Research and work 
Bowers is well known for leading research in high speed lasers, modulators and photodetectors which led to advances in fiber optic system capacities in the 1980s and 1990s. Fiber optic systems were first deployed at data rates of 50 Megabits per second in the late 1970s, and rapidly advanced by a factor of 1000 to data rates of 50 Gbits per second over the next forty years.  All of his early work, and most of the commercial fiber optic systems utilized components made from InGaAsP materials, which became the dominant materials system for fiber optic components.

Bowers' later research focused on silicon photonics in an effort to combine the large technological infrastructure developed for silicon integrated circuits, and to expand from conventional electrical integrated circuits to PICs. This enabled a much lower cost and much higher volume production of PICs than had been previously possible. High speed modulators and photodetectors were also demonstrated in this materials system, but lasers were a major problem due to the inefficient light emission from silicon, which is an indirect bandgap material. Bowers and his students, Alex Fang and Hyundai Park, solved this problem by developing heterogeneous integration of InGaAsP materials on silicon, and this process was commercialized by Intel, Juniper, and others. He then pursued heterogeneous integration of other materials on silicon, such as magnetic materials (YIG), and nonlinear materials (LiNbO3, GaAs).

Bowers' most recent work involves monolithic growth of high gain materials on silicon. This approach was plagued by poor efficiency and poor lifetime due to the growth defects common to heteroepitaxy. He and graduate students, Rich Mirin now at NIST, developed quantum dot lasers that are robust against degradation and led to monolithic PICs.

Energy Efficiency 
Bowers founded and led the Institute for Energy Efficiency at UCSB to reduce the demand for energy and consequently reduce the consumption of energy resources and reduce the production of greenhouse gasses and the impact on climate change and sustainability. This effort involved forty faculty members at UCSB in research on topics from more efficient light emitters to more efficient data centers. One outgrowth of more efficient light emitters, solar cells and batteries, is the impact on those without access to electricity because it is cheaper and far healthier to generate light for reading by using solar power reading lights than to burn candles, kerosene or wood. Bowers formed a nonprofit, Unite to Light, to make this technology accessible to the third world. In September of 2020, Henley Hall, a three story building containing laboratories, lecture halls, and administrative office, was completed, becoming the new home for the Institute for Energy Efficiency.

Awards and honors 
1996 - LEOS William Streifer Award, IEEE
1996 - Fellow, American Physical Society
2001 - Entrepreneur of the Year Award, South Coast Business and Technology
2002 - Fellow, Optical Society of America
2005 - Member, National Academy of Engineering
2007 - ACE Award for "Most Promising New Technology”, EETimes
2009 - Nick Holonyak, Jr. Award, Optical Society of America
2012 - Tyndall Award, Optical Society of America/IEEE
2016 - Fellow, National Academy of Inventors (NAI)
2017 - IEEE Photonics Award
2018 - Pioneer Award, South Coast Business and Technology 
2020 - IEEE Life Fellow
2020 & 2021 - Highly Cited Researcher List 
2021 - IPRM Award
2022 - American Association for the Advancement to Science (AAAS) Fellow

Selected papers 
J. E. Bowers, “High Speed Semiconductor Laser Design and Performance,” Invited Paper, Solid State Electronics, 30 (1), 1, January 1, 1987 
A. W. Fang, H. Park, O. Cohen, R. Jones, M. J. Paniccia, and J. E. Bowers, “Electrically Pumped Hybrid AlGaInAs-Silicon Evanescent Laser,” Optics Express, 14, 9203-9210, October, 2006 
D. Liang and J. E. Bowers, "Recent progress in lasers on silicon," Nature Photonics, Invited Paper, 4 (8), 511-517, August, 2010 
A. Y. Liu, S. Srinivasan, A. Gossard, J. Norman, and J.E. Bowers; “Quantum dot lasers for silicon photonics” Invited Paper, OSA Photonics Research, (3)5, B1-B9, October 1, 2015
M. L. Davenport, S. Skendžić, N. Volet, J. C. Hulme, M. J. R. Heck, and J. Bowers, “Heterogeneous Silicon/III-V Semiconductor Optical Amplifiers” Invited Paper, IEEE Journal of Selected Topics in Quantum Electronics (JSTQE), (22)6, 1-11, Nov.-Dec. 2016.
D. Jung, Z. Zhang, J. Norman, R. Herrick, MJ Kennedy, P. Patel, K. Turnlund, C. Jan, Y. Wan, A. Gossard, and J. E. Bowers, "Highly reliable low threshold InAs quantum dot lasers on on-axis (001) Si with 87% injection efficiency," ACS Photonics, (5)3, 1094-1100, December 18, 2017.
J. C. Norman, D. Jung, Y. Wan, and John E. Bowers, “Perspective: The Future of Quantum Dot Photonic Integrated Circuits”, Invited Paper, Applied Physics Letters Photonics, (3)3, 030901, March 27, 2018. 
D. T. Spencer, T. Drake, T. C. Briles, J. Stone, L. C. Sinclair, C. Fredrick, Q. Li, D. Westly, B. Robert Ilic, A. Bluestone, N. Volet, T. Komljenovic, L. Chang, S. H. Lee, D. Y. Oh, M.-G. Suh, K. Y. Yang, M. H. P. Pfeiffer, T. J. Kippenberg, E. Norberg, L. Theogarajan, K. Vahala, N. R. Newbury, K. Srinivasan, J. E. Bowers, S.A. Diddams, and S. B. Papp, “An optical-frequency synthesizer using integrated photonics,” Nature, 557, 81-85, April 25, 2018.
A. Y. Liu and J. Bowers, “Photonic Integration with Epitaxial III-V on Silicon”, Invited Paper, IEEE Journal of Selected Topics in Quantum Electronics, (24)6, 6000412, July 9, 2018. 
R. Jones, P. Doussiere, J. B. Driscoll, W. Lin, H. Yu, Y. Akulova, T. Komljenovic, and J. E. Bowers “Heterogeneously Integrated Photonics“, Invited paper, IEEE Nanotechnology Magazine 17, April (2019).
C. Xiang, W. Jin, J. Guo, J. D. Peters, M. J. Kennedy, J. Selvidge, P. A. Morton, and J. E. Bowers, “Narrow-linewidth III-V/Si/Si3N4 laser using multilayer heterogeneous integration,” Optica 7, 20–21 (2020).
C. Xiang, J. Liu, J. Guo, L. Chang, R. N. Wang, W. Weng, J. Peters, W. Xie, Z. Zhang, J. Riemensberger, J. Selvidge, T. J. Kippenberg, and J. E. Bowers, "Laser soliton microcombs heterogeneously integrated on silicon", Science 373, 99 (2021).

See also 
Hybrid silicon laser

References 

20th-century American physicists
American electrical engineers
21st-century American engineers
University of California, Santa Barbara faculty
University of Minnesota College of Science and Engineering alumni
Stanford University alumni
Living people
Year of birth missing (living people)
Fellows of Optica (society)
Fellow Members of the IEEE
Members of the United States National Academy of Engineering
20th-century American engineers
Fellows of the American Physical Society
21st-century American physicists
Scientists at Bell Labs
Optical engineers